Thunder Lake is a lake in Cass County, Minnesota, in the United States.  Thunder Lake is 1,346 acres in size and reaches a depth of 95 feet. Thunder Lake is located in the western corner of the Mississippi River - Grand Rapids Watershed and is surrounded by dense forested areas including the Chippewa National Forest and the Land O'Lakes State Forest. The shoreline is approximately 16 miles long and 83% of the lake has a depth greater than 15 feet. Thunder Lake has high water clarity with a Secchi depth of approximately 17 feet.

"Thunder Lake" is likely an English translation of the Native American name.

See also
List of lakes in Minnesota

References

Lakes of Cass County, Minnesota
Lakes of Minnesota